Verrua Po is a comune (municipality) in the Province of Pavia in the Italian region Lombardy, located about 45 km south of Milan and about 11 km south of Pavia.

References

Cities and towns in Lombardy